Andrius Mazuronis (born 13 July 1979) is an engineer, a Deputy Speaker of the Seimas and Member of the Seimas since 2008.

Biography
His father is an architect and a politician Valentinas Mazuronis.

He graduated from high school in Šiauliai. In 1997 he entered Vilnius Gediminas Technical University. In 2003, he completed his master's degree studies and obtained a master's degree in civil engineering. He also obtained the certificates of the special building maintenance manager and the building construction manager of a special building.

From 2003 to 2008 and from 2018 to 2019 worked in the private sector.

Political life
He was Member of the Seimas from 2008 to 2016 and again from 2019. In 2017, he worked as an Accredited Assistant to the then MEP Antanas Guoga.

From 2006 to 2015 Mazuronis belonged to the Order and Justice, was a member of the Liberal Movement from 2015 to 2019. From 2019 he is Member of the Labour Party.

On 13 November 2020 was elected as Deputy Speaker of the Seimas.

References

Sources
 http://www.vrk.lt/rinkimai/400_lt/KandidatuSarasai/RinkimuOrganizacija3442.html  2008 m. Lietuvos Respublikos Seimo rinkimai – Partija Tvarka ir teisingumas – Iškelti kandidatai
 https://www.lrs.lt/sip/portal.show?p_r=35299&p_k=1&p_a=498&p_asm_id=53932

1979 births
Living people
Members of the Seimas
21st-century Lithuanian politicians